Avis, formerly spelled Aviz, is a municipality in the District of Portalegre in Portugal. The population in 2011 was 4,571, in an area of 605.97 km2.
The present Mayor is Nuno Silva, elected by the Unitary Democratic Coalition. The municipal holiday is Easter Monday.

History

The fortified city, of which parts have been preserved, was home to the Knights of the Order of Aviz. The Order grew into the Kingdom of Portugal's second dynasty, the House of Aviz, and its name today subsists as one of the Portuguese Republic's highest military honors.

Gallery

Climate

Parishes
Administratively, the municipality is divided into 6 civil parishes (freguesias):
 Alcórrego e Maranhão
 Aldeia Velha
 Avis
 Benavila e Valongo
 Ervedal
 Figueira e Barros

See also
Castelo de Avis

References

External links

Town Hall official website
Photos from Avis
3D models

 
Populated places in Portalegre District
Municipalities of Portalegre District